The 1919–20 Penn Quakers men's ice hockey season was the 8th season of play for the program.

Season
The Program was rekindled after World War I, having been dormant since 1911. Penn alumnus George Orton, a bronze medalist in the steeplechase at the 1900 Summer Olympics, served as head coach for the program's second resurrection. The Philadelphia Ice Palace, which opened on February 14, became Penn's first indoor home.

Roster

Standings

Schedule and results

|-
!colspan=12 style=";" | Regular Season

† Lafayette was an unofficial club team.

References

Penn Quakers men's ice hockey seasons
Penn
Penn
Penn
Penn